The Kansas City administrative region of the Missouri Department of Conservation encompasses Bates, Benton, Cass, Clay, Henry, Jackson, Johnson, Lafayette, Pettis, Platte, St. Clair, and Vernon counties.  The regional office is located in Lee's Summit.

Notes 

 Acreage and counties from MDCLand GIS file
 Names, descriptions, and locations from Conservation Atlas Online GIS file

References 

 
 

Kansas City region